Dangda is a Thai surname. Notable people with the surname include:

Taneekarn Dangda (born 1992), Thai footballer
Teerasil Dangda (born 1988), Thai footballer, brother of Taneekarn

Thai-language surnames